The Apostolic Church (in Czech: Apoštolská církev) is a Pentecostal denomination in Czech Republic.

History
Pentecostalism came in 1910 to the present Czech and Slovak lands, and spread to Brno, Prague and  other places and was registered as The Union of Resolved Pentecostal Christians. The church passed through many difficulties under the Nazi occupation and during the Communist regime, when 1948 it was abolished. Only in 1977 the Pentecostals could set up an organisation and the Apostolic Church was founded on Czechoslovakia. After the separation of Slovakia the church was officially legalized in 1989 by the Czech Republic government. Today, the Apostolic Church keeps close fellowship with its Slovak counterpart and both maintain a Bible school in Kolín, close to Prague.

In 2008 there was nearly 3400 members in 110 communities, and the church polity is episcopal.

References
 Website from the Ecumenical Council of Czech Republic
 Hall, I.R. "Europe, Eastern". in Burgess, Stanley M.; van der Maar, Eduard. The New International Dictionary of Pentecostal and Charismatic Movements. Grand Rapids, MI: Zondervan, 2002 .pp. 94–96.
 Nichol, J. T. Pentecostalism. New York: Harper & Row. Roberts, 1966.

Pentecostal denominations established in the 20th century
Evangelicalism in Europe
Protestantism in the Czech Republic
Pentecostal denominations in Europe

cs:Apoštolská církev
sk:Apoštolská cirkev na Slovensku